James M. Danko is an American entrepreneur and academic administrator serving as the 21st president of Butler University in Indianapolis, Indiana.

Early life and career

Danko grew up in Parma, Ohio, a suburb of Cleveland. He started his first business, a medical and fitness equipment company, when he was 19, simultaneously earning a Bachelor of Arts degree in religious studies from John Carroll University. He ran his company for 17 years and it became the largest fitness equipment company in Ohio at the time. Danko sold his company in 1990 and earned a Master of Business Administration from the University of Michigan.

Career 
He went on to serve in business school leadership roles at institutions including the University of Michigan, the University of North Carolina at Chapel Hill, Tuck School of Business, and Villanova School of Business. He was appointed dean of the Villanova School of Business in 2005. During his tenure there, VSB moved from an unranked, regional college to a nationally-ranked American business school.

Butler University

Danko became the president of Butler University in November 2011. During his tenure, the university has reported a significant increase in the number of applicants and financial support, and has received several high regional and national rankings. In interviews, Danko has talked of plans to expand the university's reputation and student population, and in 2013, he moved to enter Butler in the Big East Conference. Danko also became Vice-Chair of the Big East Board of Directors, and currently represents them on the NCAA Division I Presidential Forum.

Personal life 
Danko and his wife Bethanie currently reside on the Butler University campus.

References

Year of birth missing (living people)
Living people
American university and college faculty deans
John Carroll University alumni
People from Cleveland
Ross School of Business alumni